Ruskin is an unincorporated community in Rice County, Minnesota, United States.

The community is located at the junction of Rice County Road 23 (Gates Avenue) and 220th Street East.

State Highway 60 (MN 60) is nearby.  Ruskin is located within Richland Township and Walcott Township.

A school, the Ruskin School, is located near the center of the community.

Ruskin is located within ZIP code 55021, based in Faribault.

References

Unincorporated communities in Minnesota
Unincorporated communities in Rice County, Minnesota